Daniel George Niculae (born 6 October 1982) is a former Romanian professional footballer who played mainly as a striker. Currently he is the president of Liga I club 
Rapid București.

He has made 39 appearances for Romania since his debut in 2003.

Club career

Rapid București
Daniel "Nico" Niculae started his professional career at Rapid București in 2000. Despite a period playing for the B team in 2001, Nico proved he is one of the most gifted players of the club, and helped his club to win the championship in the 2002–03 season – his first as a first-team regular.

Niculae was Rapid's leading scorer in the 2004–05 season, with 14 goals – the third highest total in Romania's Liga 1.

In the 2005–06 UEFA Cup campaign, he and Mugurel Buga formed one of the most powerful striker pairs of the competition, with Niculae scoring 8 goals, as Rapid reached the Quarter-Finals of the competition. The season also saw Rapid claim the 2006 Romanian Cup, with Niculae scoring the winning goal in the first minute of extra-time, against Național București.

Auxerre
Niculae was transferred to French club AJ Auxerre in the summer of 2006, for €3.3 million. His first season with the club saw him score 4 goals in the UEFA Cup, but he struggled for goals in Ligue 1. However, the following season his form improved, as he scored 11 goals to help keep the club in Ligue 1.

The 2008–09 season was one to forget for Niculae. He was deeply affected by the loss of his father, and despite threatening to score on several occasions, he failed to find the net in 32 games.

Things got back on track in 2009–10 however. Jean Fernandez initially wanted to loan out Niculae for the season, but the latest signing Alexandre Licata was ruled out for most of the season with a serious ankle injury. Daniel Niculae found a new role in the Auxerre side, as a creator of goals rather than a scorer of them. As of April 2010, he lies third in the table for assists in Ligue 1 with a total of 8. He has a brilliant entente with Polish goalscorer Ireneusz Jeleń and has helped the Burgundian side to reach second in the table and to thus push for the Champions League places.

Monaco
After the expiration of his contract with AJ Auxerre on 15 June 2010, Niculae signed a three-year-deal with Ligue 1 rivals AS Monaco.

On 31 August 2011, Niculae signed for French side AS Nancy on a season-long loan. In a game against his former club, AJ Auxerre, on 30 January 2012, Nicuale scored a double giving his team the win. Although, before the game started, Auxerre's supporters booed him, at the end he got a standing ovation for his impressive performance.

Kuban Krasnodar
On 6 June 2012, he joined the Russian club Kuban Krasnodar, on a two-year contract. Here he will be coached by Yuri Krasnozhan.

International career
Niculae won his first international cap for Romania in 2003, but did not become a regular squad member until the 2005–06 season.

He was selected for Romania's Euro 2008 squad, and started his country's first two matches. He came on as a substitute for their final group game against the Netherlands, but could not help Romania to a win, which would have taken the country into the Quarter-Finals.

Other than the fact that they share birthplace, he has no connection with namesake and fellow international Marius Niculae.

Career statistics

Scores and results list Romania's goal tally first, score column indicates score after each Niculae goal.

Honours
Rapid București
Divizia A: 2002–03
Cupa României: 2001–02, 2005–06
Supercupa României: 2002, 2003
Liga IV – Bucharest: 2017–18

Auxerre
UEFA Intertoto Cup: 2006 

Astra Giurgiu
Liga I: 2015–16
Cupa României runner-up: 2016–17
Supercupa României: 2016

References

External links

 
 
 
 
 

1982 births
Living people
Romania under-21 international footballers
Romania international footballers
Footballers from Bucharest
Romanian footballers
Association football forwards
FC Rapid București players
AJ Auxerre players
AS Monaco FC players
AS Nancy Lorraine players
FC Kuban Krasnodar players
FC Astra Giurgiu players
Liga I players
Liga II players
Ligue 1 players
Russian Premier League players
Romanian expatriate footballers
Romanian expatriate sportspeople in Monaco
Romanian expatriate sportspeople in France
Romanian expatriate sportspeople in Russia
Expatriate footballers in France
Expatriate footballers in Monaco
Expatriate footballers in Russia
UEFA Euro 2008 players
FC Rapid București presidents